The Paula Method is a proposed alternative to Kegel exercises. The idea is that by strengthening your sphincter muscles (eye muscle: orbicularis oculi and mouth muscle: orbicularis oris), the contractions would also strengthen the sphincter muscles in the pelvic floor. Evidence to support its use is lacking.

References

Sexual health
Health issues in pregnancy
Physical exercise
Women's health